Bolton St Catherine's Academy is a mixed Church of England all-through school. The school is located in the Breightmet area of Bolton in the English county of Greater Manchester.

The school was formed in September 2009 from the merger of Withins School and Top o'th' Brow Primary School, both community schools administered by Bolton Metropolitan Borough Council. Bolton St Catherine's Academy became part of The Bishop Fraser Trust in May 2018 alongside Canon Slade School and St James's CofE High School. www.thebishopfrasertrust.org.uk  but coordinates with Bolton Council for admissions. The school offers Nursery, primary - double class entry per year, secondary - 160 per year, education for pupils aged 3 to 16.

In 2012 Bolton St Catherine's Academy relocated from the two former school sites to a new campus on Stitch-Mi-Lane. The new campus also houses Firwood Special School, a community special school for pupils aged 11 – 16.

BSCA work in partnership not only with Canon Slade School and St James's CofE High School, but also the Manchester Diocese, Bolton Council, Urban Outreach, NHS and local Churches - Christ Church, Kings Church and Bridge Church whom work closely with out Christian Youth Support Workers. The students at BSCA fundraise for 3 main charities - Urban Outreach, Comic/Sport Relief and Christian Aid.

References

External links
Bolton St Catherine's Academy official website

Primary schools in the Metropolitan Borough of Bolton
Secondary schools in the Metropolitan Borough of Bolton
Church of England primary schools in the Diocese of Manchester
Church of England secondary schools in the Diocese of Manchester
Academies in the Metropolitan Borough of Bolton